Armastuse ämblik (Love spider) is a compilation album by Estonian rock musician Urmas Alender, coupled with Kohtumine Albertiga. It was previously released with Kohtumine Albertiga on the box set Kohtumine Albertiga.

The album is by tracks 7-18 a re-release of Hingelind, plus there are various other songs added.

Track listing
 "Paaria" (Pariah) (Urmas Alender/Heiti Talvik) - 1:12
 "Laupäev naisega" (Saturday with the woman) (Urmas Alender/Jüri Üdi) - 3:14
 "Sina pikajuukseline!" (You long-haired!) (Urmas Alender/Rudolf Rimmel) - 1:35
 "Kevade" (Spring) (Urmas Alender/Marje Teslon) - 2:58
 "Kui kaua veel" (How much longer) (Urmas Alender/Urmas Alender) - 3:34
 "Öine vahetus" (Night shift) (Urmas Alender/Ott Arder) - 3:06
 "On kui kevad" (As it's spring) (Urmas Alender/Virve Osila) - 2:54
 "Sa ütlesid: näkku ei lööda" (You said: no hitting in the face) (Urmas Alender/Virve Osila) - 2:16
 "Solaarne" (untranslatable) (Urmas Alender/Virve Osila) - 3:03
 "Suvenukrus" (Summer sadness) (Urmas Alender/Virve Osila) - 2:17
 "Kohtumine" (Meeting) (Urmas Alender/Virve Osila) - 2:25
 "Mereigatsus" (Sea yearning) (Urmas Alender/Virve Osila) - 2:46
 "Unenägu" (A dream) (Urmas Alender/Virve Osila) - 1:15
 "Vihmane ja talvekauge" (Rainy and winter distant) (Urmas Alender/Virve Osila) - 5:25
 "Neoonist silmad külmas kivilinnas" (Neon eyes in a cold stone city) (Urmas Alender/Virve Osila) - 2:11
 "Lummus" (Enchanted) (Urmas Alender/Virve Osila) - 3:00
 "Lootuses" (In hope) (Urmas Alender/Virve Osila) - 2:21
 "Elame veel" (We live more) (Urmas Alender/Virve Osila) - 2:36
 "Mõtisklus" (Contemplation) (Gennadi Podelski/Heldur Karmo) - 1:45
 "Metsluiged (Vennad luiged)" (Wild swans (Brothers swans)) (Rene Eespere/Leelo Tungal) - 3:29

References

Urmas Alender albums
2003 compilation albums
Estonian-language albums